Quarantine Island (also known as Kamau Taurua and officially gazetted as Quarantine Island / Kamau Taurua), is the largest island in Otago Harbour, close to the city of Dunedin, New Zealand. The buildings on the island are owned by Quarantine Island / Kamau Taurua Community Incorporated (QIKTC). Its management is shared between QIKTC and the Department of Conservation.

A smaller island, Rakiriri, lies close to Quarantine Island. Both islands lie across the harbour between the town of Port Chalmers and the marine laboratory on Portobello Peninsula, part of the Otago Peninsula.

Names 

The island has been known by a number of names, including St Martin Island. In 1996 as part of the Ngāi Tahu Treaty of Waitangi settlement the name of Kamau Taurua, meaning 'a place to set nets' was restored as part of the official name of Quarantine Island/Kamau Taurua.

History 
The island served as the quarantine station for Otago from 1863 until 1924. It was one of four in New Zealand. When ships arrived in Otago harbour with infectious diseases, passengers were quarantined for that disease, usually one to two weeks, but sometimes longer. The few passengers that were actually sick were treated in the hospital on top of the island. In total 41 ships were quarantined at the island. Of about 9,000 people quarantined about 70 died.  There is a small cemetery on the island where they and some of the keeper's family are buried.

During the First World War, soldiers who had venereal diseases (either diagnosed when they volunteered or acquired abroad) were treated on the island, then called the 'Port Chalmers Military Hospital'. However, most New Zealand soldiers with VD were treated overseas.

Only one of the main quarantine buildings from these years has survived, and this is now saved. The island has a Heritage New Zealand Historic Area classification. After the quarantine station closed in 1924 the buildings were sold and island was leased.

Visitors 
Now the area around the buildings is leased by QIKTC, established in 1958 as St Martin Island Community, and the remainder jointly managed by the Community and the Department of Conservation. The resident keeper welcomes visitors to St Martin Lodge, and oversees a wide range of ecological, educational, historical and cultural projects.



See also 
 List of islands of New Zealand
 List of historic places in Dunedin
 Otago Harbour

Notes

References
 Peat, N & Patrick, B (2002) Wild Dunedin, University of Otago Press, Dunedin
 Russell and McGeorge, P (2004) New Zealand's Islands, Bateman. 
 Herd, J. & Griffiths, G.J. (1980). Discovering Dunedin. John McIndoe. .
 Hancock, L (2008) Quarantine Island / Kamau Taurua (St Martin Island) A short history St Martin Island Community, Dunedin.

External links 

 Nearshore islands Te Ara - the Encyclopedia of New Zealand
 The Island Quarantine Island / Kamau Taurua Community (Inc) Information
 The keeper of Quarantine Island RNZ interview, 6 October 2020

Geography of Dunedin
Port Chalmers
Islands of Otago